Denis Sokolov (born January 27, 1977) is a Russian professional ice hockey defenceman. He currently plays with Avtomobilist Yekaterinburg of the Kontinental Hockey League (KHL).

Sokolov played the 2009–10 KHL season with HC Sibir Novosibirsk.

References

External links

Living people
HC Sibir Novosibirsk players
1977 births
Russian ice hockey defencemen